Alexios and Kassandra are two interconnected fictional characters in Ubisoft's Assassin's Creed video game franchise, first appearing as the player characters of the 2018 video game Assassin's Creed Odyssey. Alexios and Kassandra are portrayed through performance capture by Michael Antonakos and Melissanthi Mahut respectively. Leonidas Castrounis and Maria Syrgiannis respectively voice the two characters as children in flashbacks.

Within the series' alternate historical setting, both characters are half-siblings who were separated from their Spartan parents and each other during childhood due to a prophecy delivered by the Pythia, the Oracle of Delphi. Through their mother Myrrine, the siblings are descendants of a fictional version of Leonidas I, who is himself descended from the otherworldly Isu, the so-called First Civilization, and wielded a spear that is imbued with fantastical powers. In Odyssey, the player has the choice to experience the memories of either Alexios or Kassandra as part of a simulation played by another in-game character, Layla Hassan. The chosen character becomes the elder sibling in the game's narrative, who is stranded from childhood on the island of Kephalonia following a traumatic incident at Mount Taygetos, and as an adult becomes a legendary mercenary known as the "Eagle Bearer". The younger sibling in turn becomes "Deimos", a revered enforcer of a secret society known as the Cult of Kosmos and one of the game's primary antagonists. 

Odyssey's story follows the Eagle Bearer's journey across Classical Greece during the Peloponnesian War as they attempt to reunite their fractured family and hunt down the Cult of Kosmos, who are depicted as the orchestrators of the war. Within the series' lore, Kassandra is designated as the canon Eagle Bearer, appearing as such in Odysseys novelization and later reconfirmed in Odysseys successor, Assassin's Creed Valhalla, in which Kassandra appears as a guest character as part of a bonus questline added after the game's release.

Both characters have received a positive reception from video game journalists and series fans following their debut. Kassandra in particular has received attention as a positive example of gender equality and representation in video games, as well as critical acclaim in response to Mahut's performance and interpretation of the character.

Character overview
In Odyssey, former Abstergo employee Layla Hassan discovers the broken spear of King Leonidas of Sparta, which is in fact a powerful Isu artifact. After reliving Leonidas' final moment of triumph during the Battle of Thermopylai for the game's tutorial section, she is then presented with a choice to explore the genetic memories of Leonidas' grandchildren, either Alexios or Kassandra, via her portable Animus machine in her search for the Staff of Hermes Trismegistus, another Isu artifact. Whoever is chosen by the player as Layla in Odyssey is revealed to be the legendary mercenary known as the Eagle Bearer who was active during the Peloponnesian War, and whose exploits are detailed in the purportedly lost accounts of a version of Herodotos in the Assassin's Creed universe. As a mercenary who is typically referred to by the term misthios which means "employed for hire" or "hired servant" in the ancient Greek language, the Eagle Bearer is a departure from series tradition as they have no direct ties to the Assassin Brotherhood or any related organization. 

As Alexios or Kassandra, the player may choose how to respond to non-player characters by engaging in dialogue trees with them to learn information and progress the story, with some of the choices potentially changing or affecting the fates of the characters they interact with. Throughout the game the Eagle Bearer has access to a loyal horse named Phobos, whose appearance is customizable and can be summoned almost anytime and anywhere. The Eagle Bearer embarks on an extended journey across the Greek world on board their ship the Adrestia, where they encounter interpretations of various real world historical figures in the Assassin's Creed universe such as Perikles, Kleon, Aspasia, Sokrates, Alkibiades, Aristophanes, Hippokrates, Brasidas, and the Two Kings of Sparta. 

For the game's novelization written by Gordon Doherty, Kassandra appears as the Eagle Bearer who opposes the Cult of Kosmos and eventually inherits the Staff of Hermes Trismegistus from Pythagoras. Alexios is shaped to become a weapon to be used by the Cult, henceforth known by the name Deimos. His allegiance to the Cult puts him at odds with his sister, who attempts to dismantle their influence across the Greek world in the midst of the Peloponnesian War and to reunite their family, and later dies fighting Kassandra at Mount Taygethos.

Creation and development

In an interview by Tom Hoggins from The Telegraph, Odyssey senior producer Marc-Alexis Côté said that the Kephallonia section early in the game is "about discovering who these characters are and find out why you should join them on this journey". Côté explained that the notion of choice is determined by the development team as one of their "core pillars" for the game, and that is extended to the player being given their choice of character. Côté noted that player feedback from the option to play as Evie Frye in Assassin's Creed Syndicate helped informed the team with insight on how to push this further for Odyssey, and claimed that the team was able to build a better game as a result as everyone is satisfied with the "good gender split on the game". The implementation of a branching dialogue system, which Côté said is supposed to transform the way player's would approach their gameplay experience through dialogue choices, was the main change in how the developmental team approached building the game. He explained that it involved a lot more preparation compared to previous projects in the series, as the writing team for Odyssey expanded from a duo to a team of fifteen staff members during development. Côté said that the game's novelization was an extension of the project, and as its narrative is meant to be linear, a canon storyline for the novel had to be drafted.

In July 2020, a report by Jason Schreier from Bloomberg about the mishandling of sexual misconduct allegations by Ubisoft claimed that Kassandra was originally meant to be the sole playable character of Odyssey, and the inclusion of Alexios as an alternative player character was insinuated to be the result of a compromise with Ubisoft management, a situation described to be "illustrative of the sexism ingrained within the company".

Portrayal
Actors Michael Antonakos and Melissanthi Mahut, who portray Alexios and Kassandra respectively, are of Greek heritage. With regards to the casting process of characters in Odyssey, audio director Lydia Andrew noted that Ubisoft tried to look for actors who are from Greece or have Greek ancestry. She indicated that it felt like a good opportunity to have a "deep dive into the culture of Greece and obviously Ancient Greece", and that it is just as important to work with good Greek actors as casting a great actor who is very good at portraying an accent. Mahut recalled that Antonakos was already chosen for the role of Alexios prior to the finalization of her own audition for the role of Kassandra, where she had the opportunity to play off Antonakos.

At the beginning of the process, the creative directors and writers of Odyssey gave both actors a "skeleton" idea of their characters as well as some insight as to their history, possible path and general characteristics. Antonakos and Mahut made it a point to work as a team, often holding discussions with each other about where they saw their respective characters going, and what they thought their main attributes were, and how they would respond in key situations. During motion capture sessions they would constantly give each other notes as to how they would like to approach certain scenes. Voice over sessions involved a lengthier process as they often were not in the same area or room, so they followed their personal choices as well as guidance by their respective directors.

Antonakos did not initially know what Alexios would look like and developed his own take on the character by drawing inspiration from previous series protagonist Ezio Auditore da Firenze, as well as the animated series iterations of Wolverine and Batman from the 1980s and 1990s. Antonakos described Alexios as a "boisterous Bruce Wayne with a Greek accent" who resembles an "explosive Wolverine" when he is angry. Antonakos was also inspired by Pink Floyd's Wish You Were Here, which he used to ground the character into something deeper after he is given the context of the character's backstory as a "soundtrack to his pain". On the character's display of machismo, Antonakos said Alexios is essentially a demigod with supernatural strength who is also immersed in the Ancient Greek warrior culture and explained that his arrogance is "just a show, a mask for his insecurity of being alone", noting that he is in truth "a big kid acting tough" with "huge guilt issues" and "something to prove".

On portraying the identity of Deimos for their respective characters, Mahut wanted Kassandra to remain as a relatable character, even when she commits acts which are cruel or inhumane. She took key elements that made the elder sibling what they are, and "put a filter over them". She tried to imagine how a younger sibling would evolve from a traumatic childhood of being rejected and abandoned, but at the same time possessing a god-like strength. Antonakos decided to play Deimos as a different person entirely, and explained that he is the younger sibling who never experienced a normal childhood living in Spartan society and thus does not possess the same moral compass an elder Alexios would have had because he was never shown any compassion and sympathy by those who raised him. Antonakos projected a darker and lower voice compared to the one he gave Alexios as the Eagle Bearer, giving him no room for a smile unless it had a sense of tormenting behind it. As part of their motion capture performances, which constituted about 10%-15% of the game, the actors had to wear velcro/lycra suits and helmets with attached cameras. Both Antonakos and Mahut did their best to match each other's performances, gestures and movements, as the production team would use the same edits to cut the scenes together.

Appearances

Assassin's Creed Odyssey

In Assassin's Creed Odyssey, the player experiences Kassandra's life as part of a simulation played by another in-game character, Layla Hassan, who is researching Kassandra's memories to locate Atlantis on behalf of the Assassin Brotherhood. Kassandra starts out as a mercenary operating on the island of Kephallonia, where she was raised by a merchant named Markos after being separated from her family as a child, and befriended another girl in Markos's care, Phoibe. A series of flashbacks later reveal Kassandra's backstory: she lived with her parents Nikolaos and Myrrine in Sparta until the age of seven, when her infant brother Alexios was sentenced to death in deference to an oracle's prophecy which said he would doom Sparta. Trying to save Alexios, Kassandra accidentally pushed both him and a Spartan elder off Mount Taygetos. She was branded a traitor for this, and Nikolaos, in adherence to Spartan law, reluctantly threw her off the mountain. Kassandra survived the fall and, after befriending a golden eagle named Ikaros, who would become her companion, made her way to Kephallonia, where Markos found her and took her in.

In 431 BC, at the onset of the Peloponnesian War, Kassandra is hired by a man named Elpenor to assassinate  "The Wolf of Sparta" in Megaris, and departs Kephallonia after befriending a naval captain named Barnabas and assuming command of his ship, the Adrestia. Kassandra soon discovers that "The Wolf" is in fact a sobriquet for Nikolaos; that Nikolaos is not her biological father and has another adopted son, Stentor; and that Myrinne left Nikolaos and Sparta shortly after the incident at Mount Taygetos. While travelling to Delphi to ask the Pythia for Myrrine's whereabouts, Kassandra meets Herodotos, who reveals his extensive knowledge of the Spear of Leonidas, which Kassandra wields, and joins her on her journey. Upon meeting the Pythia, Kassandra is warned about a secretive organization known as the Cult of Kosmos that is targeting her family. After discovering Elpenor is a Cult member, Kassandra kills him and uses his disguise to infiltrate a secret Cult meeting. She learns that the Cult plans to take advantage of the war to seize control of Greece and that their enforcer, known as "Deimos", is Alexios, who had also survived his fall off Mount Taygetos, but was taken in by the Cult and brainwashed to serve their cause.

Kassandra journeys to Athens to warn Perikles of the Cult and request his help in finding Myrrine. She befriends several of his associates, such as Alkibiades, Aristophanes, Sokrates, and Perkiles' wife Aspasia, who provide her with several leads, and also reunites with Phoibe, now working as Aspasia's assistant. Kassandra follows each lead but is unable to locate Myrrine. Returning to Athens in 429 BC, Kassandra finds the city ravaged by a plague and fails to stop the Cult from killing Perikles and Phoibe. She escapes with Aspasia to Naxos, where they find Myrrine, now the oligarch of the island. Myrrine asks Kassandra to accompany her back to Sparta, and directs her to Atlantis to meet her true father, Pythagoras. Pythagoras explains that he and Myrrine conceived Kassandra to preserve Leonidas' bloodline, as his descendants have a connection with Precursor artifacts, such as Leonidas' spear, and tasks Kassandra with recovering other artifacts to permanently seal Atlantis and prevent its knowledge from being misused by the Cult.

In Sparta, Kassandra meets its two kings, Archidamus II and Pausanias, who task her with securing Sparta's victory in the Olympic Games and helping Stentor conquer Boeotia. She succeeds in both tasks, obtaining evidence that Pausanias is a Cult member in the process. Pausanias is ousted after Kassandra exposes his betrayal, and she and Myrrine are granted back their Spartan citizenship and home. In 425 BC, Kassandra encounters and fights Alexios during the Battle of Pylos, but is captured by the Cult and taken to Athens, where Kleon, Perikles' former rival and another Cult member, enjoys popularity as leader of the city-state. Kassandra escapes captivity and, with the help of her allies, foils Kleon's plans, ultimately killing him during the Battle of Amphipolis in 422 BC. Afterwards, she travels with Myrrine to Mount Taygetos to confront Alexios and try to redeem him. However, they are unsuccessful, and Kassandra is forced to kill Alexios when he threatens Myrrine's life. 

After eliminating all Cult members, Kassandra returns to their meeting place under the Temple of Delphi and finds a pyramid-shaped artifact the Cult was using to influence Greek politics. Touching it, she receives visions of future conflicts, before being met by Aspasia, who reveals herself to be the Cult's original leader and that she had been secretly working to undermine it after becoming disillusioned with the other members' ideals. Kassandra spares Aspasia, but destroys the artifact. During her journey, Kassandra also collects all the artifacts Pythagoras requested, whereupon she activates a recording from the Precursor Aletheia, who pleads with Layla through Kassandra as proxy that Precursor technology must be destroyed for humanity to reach its potential. After sealing Atlantis, Pythagoras passes the Staff of Hermes Trismegistus, another Precursor artifact, on to Kassandra, granting her biological immortality.

In 2018, Kassandra meets Layla as she is analyzing data recovered from the Animus in order to re-activate Atlantis. She tasks Layla with restoring the balance between order and chaos, represented by organizations such as the Templars and the Assassins, respectively, and passes away after relinquishing the staff to Layla.

Legacy of the First Blade 

The first story expansion for the game, Legacy of the First Blade, set both during and after the events of the main narrative campaign, focuses on Kassandra's conflict with the Order of the Ancients, the same organization featured in Assassin's Creed Origins, who are forerunners of the Templar Order, the series' perennial antagonists. Kassandra joins forces with Darius, a Persian renegade and freedom fighter who assassinated Xerxes I of Persia (in what is the first recorded use of the Assassins' signature weapon, the Hidden Blade), to fight the Order, first in Macedonia and later in Achaea and Messenia. The Order is committing atrocities against the local populace to draw out the "Tainted Ones", people descended from the Isu race known to humans as gods, such as Kassandra and her family, which the Order seeks to eliminate, believing they have the potential to doom all of humanity. Over the course of the expansion, Kassandra starts a family with Natakas, Darius's son, giving birth to a boy they name Elpidios, who is later taken by the Order, who also murder Natakas. Kassandra and Darius exact revenge on the Order and kill its leader and Darius' former ally Amorges, who gives them Elpidios' whereabouts but warns them that the Order can not be vanquished and that Elpidios will never be safe as long as he is with Kassandra. After finding Elpidios, Kassandra, concerned for his safety, decides to leave him with Darius, entrusting him to look after his grandson. Darius takes Elpidios to Egypt, when it is revealed that he would become an ancestor to Aya of Alexandria, a major character from Assassin's Creed Origins and one of the co-founders of the Hidden Ones, a precursor organization to the Assassin Brotherhood.

The Fate of Atlantis
The second story expansion, The Fate of Atlantis, is set after the events of the base game and follows Kassandra's quest to learn how unlock the full power of the Staff of Hermes and her hidden sixth sense. As part of her training under Aletheia, Kassandra is transported to a simulation based on the Isu realm of Elysium, where she discovers Adonis is leading a human rebellion against Persephone's rule. Kassandra helps both sides in order to get closer to her goal of leaving Elysium, which can only be done if Persephone opens the gateway to the Underworld. Following Persephone's defeat, she banishes Kassandra to the Underworld along with her dog Ros, whom she transforms into Cerberos using an artifact. Kassandra is able to slay Cerberos, but this opens numerous rifts between Tartaros and the Underworld, releasing souls confined to Tartaros back into the Underworld. In an attempt to contain the chaos, Hades tasks Kassandra with finding new guardians for each of the gateways to the Underworld, promising to tell her more about the Staff in return. Kassandra accomplishes this task, but Hades refuses to keep his promise, revealing that he plans to have Kassandra become the guardian of the final gateway. Kassandra defeats Hades before Poseidon appears and escorts her to Atlantis, where he appoints her as Dikastes, his second-in-command, who is responsible with enforcing Poseidon's laws and maintaining order, as well passing judgment on Atlantis. 

While exploring Atlantis, Kassandra learns that the Isu regularly disobey Poseidon's laws and commit crimes against humanity; the most egregious of which is "Project Olympos"—a genetic engineering program led by Juno and her husband Aita—which experiments on abducted human subjects, combining them with Isu artifacts to create hybrid beasts. After defeating Juno and Aita's latest creation, the Hekatonchires, Kassandra returns to Poseidon and declares Atlantis beyond saving. Using artifacts recovered from Cerberos and the Hekatonchires, along with the fully activated Staff, Poseidon and Kassandra destroy Atlantis. Kassandra then wakes up back in the mortal world and is told by Aletheia that the memories experienced were Aletheia's memories during her time as Dikastes, and that each represented a trial for her to pass. Having successfully passed all three trials, Kassandra is appointed Keeper of the Staff and tasked with using its powers to protect humanity.

Those Who Are Treasured 
Those Who Are Treasured is a free story expansion that serves as an epilogue to the main narrative of Odyssey, depicting Kassandra's final adventure in Greece. After taking a six month vacation on the island of Korfu, a reluctant Kassandra is recruited by Barnabas and Herodotos for a treasure hunt they organised, which quickly turns into a hunt for an Isu artifact—an Apple of Eden—after Kassandra accidentally stumbles upon some pirates who are also looking for the relic. Kassandra is eventually able to recover the Apple, but it depowers her spear and corrupts Barnabas, forcing Kassandra to fight her friend over the artifact. After saving Barnabas and destroying the Apple, Kassandra is informed by Aletheia that part of her duty as Keeper is to find and destroy similarly dangerous Isu artifacts around the world. Kassandra bids farewell to Herodotos, to whom she gifts her depowered spear as a memento, and departs Greece with Barnabas to begin her new journey, starting from Egypt.

Assassin's Creed Valhalla 
Kassandra returns in Assassin's Creed Valhalla as part of the free Assassin's Creed Crossover Stories DLC expansion. She is featured in the questline titled "A Fated Encounter", where she comes face-to-face with Eivor Varinsdottir, the main protagonist of Valhalla, whilst hunting for an Isu artifact that is causing nightmares amongst the locals on the Isle of Skye, during the late 9th century. The DLC establishes that, ever since the deaths of all of her companions, Kassandra has developed very anti-social behavior, refusing to form connections with people due to her knowledge that she would eventually outlive them, and choosing to never stay in a single place more than it is necessary to complete her objective. Because of this, she is reluctant to work with Eivor to find and destroy the Isu artifact after Aletheia instructs her to do so. However, after accomplishing her mission and later attending a wedding alongside Eivor, Kassandra learns to open up to people more and is able to part ways with Eivor on good terms.

Other appearances 
Both Alexios and Kassandra appear as playable characters in Assassin's Creed: Rebellion, a mobile free-to-play strategy RPG action game. A hooded version of Alexios' outfit is an unlockable cosmetic option in the remastered version of Assassin's Creed III, released in 2019.

Promotion and merchandise
Although Kassandra is designated as the canon Eagle Bearer for the novelization and was featured prominently in gameplay demo footage shown at E3 2018, the vast majority of the marketing campaign and available merchandise for Odyssey exclusively featured Alexios, including the game's three pre-order statues, cover art, official trailer, header image on Uplay, and so on.

As part of a promotional collaboration between Ubisoft and Amazon, Antonakos' voice as Alexios is featured as part of "Assassin’s Creed Odyssey Spartan Skill", a free downloadable Alexa-based content available for all Amazon Echo devices. A limited edition Assassin’s Creed-themed Amazon Echo device, designed to resemble a Spartan helmet, was also released.

Reception
Prior to the release of Odyssey on October 5, 2018, Côté observed that there appeared to be a lot of interest into being able to play a female lead character, with about three quarters of players selecting Kassandra as the player character during a gameplay preview session in September 2018, which exceeded his own expectations. Ubisoft Québec Game Director Scott Phillips revealed that two-thirds of Odyssey players chose to play Alexios by December 2018, although he noted that the choices were statistically more evenly split during the game's playtesting stage. Both Alexios and Kassandra were jointly nominated for the 2018 Gamers' Choice Awards' Fan Favorite Character of the Year, while their respective actors received nominations in the Fan Favorite Voice Actor awards. For the 30th GLAAD Media Awards in 2019, Odyssey was one of five nominees for the inaugural "Outstanding Video Game" category. GLAAD credited the positive depiction of Kassandra and Alexios as sexually fluid characters to be one of the rationales behind the nomination, though the controversy generated by the Legacy of the First Blade DLC pack was also acknowledged. Xalavier Nelson Jr from Rock, Paper, Shotgun was of the view that both are "distinct, compelling, and valid protagonists" in their own right, and that the subtle variations between both choices colours the events of their game moreso then the differences between a male and female Commander Shepard for the original Mass Effect trilogy. On the other hand, both Ali Jones from PCGamesN and Fraser Brown from Rock, Paper, Shotgun questioned the Alexios-centric marketing campaign for Odyssey and the lack of promotion for his female counterpart. Joe Parlock opined that the executive-mandated decision to have an interchangeable lead made it more difficult for the writers to develop either Kassandra or Alexios as their own characters in response to the Bloomberg report by Schreier.

Kassandra has received near-universal critical acclaim for her characterization as an atypical female video game protagonist. With Kassandra, Ubisoft earned nominations for Outstanding Achievement in Character at the 22nd Annual D.I.C.E. Awards, and Best Character at the Italian Video Game Awards. Mahut received award nominations from 15th British Academy Games Awards, and The Game Awards 2018, for her performance as Kassandra. Kassandra has also appeared on several "top character" lists with high placements. Paste Magazine named her among the best new videogame characters of 2018, and praised her down-to-earth nature, as well as her confidence and self-assuredness which is considered to be rare for video game characters. Andy Kelly from PC Gamer proclaimed her to be the second best protagonist character of the Assassin's Creed series behind Ezio Auditore da Firenze, whose mischievous charm is said to be present in Mahut's performance; and Polygon ranked Kassandra among the best video game characters of the 2010s as well as one of their "69 biggest crushes of the last decade".

Hoggins said Kassandra was for him the obvious choice as the player character. He described her as "brilliant company" who takes absolutely no nonsense from anyone, as "her tongue is much sharper than the rusty sword she begins the game with". Samuel Axon from Ars Technica said Kassandra stole the show for him, and that choosing her for his first playthrough felt like a fresh experience; he liked the notion of a female character with agency roaming ancient Greece "liberally partaking in all the violent and sensual pleasures on offer with Conan-like revelry and impunity", framing an entirely different tone and context not unlike that of Xena: Warrior Princess. Writing for PC Gamer, Fraser Brown formed the view that Kassandra is "immediately likeable" due to her "easy-going, roguish charm", and compared her "longstanding popularity" to that of Geralt of Rivia from The Witcher media franchise which end up overshadowing the Assassin's Creed series' other protagonists. Harry Shepard, also from PC Gamer, noted that her "commanding presence oozes cool, and she has a more subtle charm" compared to her male counterpart. Colin Campbell from Polygon praised Kassandra as "one of the most complete human characters" he has ever played as in a game, noting that she comes across as "smarter and funnier" then her male counterpart, and that "her facial animations are a joy to watch, while her vocal reactions generally match her movements". Campbell's credited Mahut's performance for giving the role a greater range than Alexios’ actor. Noelle Adams from Critical Hit praised Kassandra as a physically strong and tough survivor who combines likeable traits from many other female protagonists in fiction and yet has a malleable personality, in addition to being better animated then her male counterpart. Her portrayal as an example of a liberated Spartan female archetype, as well as a potential bisexual or queer protagonist has also been praised.

Alexios has also received a generally positive reception, though he often draws an unfavorable comparison to his female counterpart.  Kelly considered Alexios to be well acted, but felt that Antonakos played him "far too straight", which in his opinion failed to differentiate the character from "a dozen other gruff videogame heroes". Shepard said he chose to play as Alexios as he preferred his character design as well as Antonakos' delivery of the profane word malaka, and felt he could better relate to Alexios due to their perceived visual similarities, though he accepted that his personality "is a bit flat" when compared to Kassandra's. Campbell said Alexios has a depth of character who is "as good as the gruffly vengeful Bayek", but commented that Antonakos' interpretation of the character comes across to him as a "cut-out Mediterranean macho hero, almost to the point of parody", with the "aura of a comedically self-important cartoon character". Axon said playing as Alexios felt like the same framing he has experienced in video games hundreds of times before, including every mainline Assassin's Creed game except Syndicate. Andy Kim from US Gamer reacted negatively to Phillips' sharing of player data which is skewed towards Alexios, and joked that two-thirds of the game's player base made the incorrect choice.

References

Further reading

External links 

Assassin's Creed Odyssey: Meet the Actors Behind Alexios and Kassandra on the official Ubisoft North America YouTube channel
Assassin’s Creed Odyssey’s Two Main Characters Compared on the official Kotaku YouTube channel
 Assassin's Creed Odyssey: Will You Play As Kassandra or Alexios? on the official IGN YouTube channel
Assassin's Creed Unlocked: Episode 1 – Kassandra  on the official Ubisoft North America YouTube channel

Assassin's Creed characters
Fantasy video game characters
Fictional archers
Fictional assassins in video games
Fictional characters who committed familicide
Fictional cult leaders
Fictional demigods
Fictional families
Fictional Greek people in video games
Fictional criminals in video games
Fictional explorers in video games
Fictional mercenaries in video games
Fictional knife-fighters
Fictional monster hunters
Fictional swordfighters in video games
Fictional traceurs and freerunners
Fictional war veterans
LGBT characters in video games
Mythology in video games
Orphan characters in video games
Role-playing video game characters
Video game characters introduced in 2018
Video game characters with slowed ageing
Video game characters with superhuman strength
Video game antagonists
Video game protagonists